Joshua David Shapiro (born June 20, 1973) is an American politician and attorney who has served as the 48th governor of Pennsylvania since 2023. A member of the Democratic Party, he served as the 50th Pennsylvania attorney general from 2017 to 2023.

Raised in Montgomery County, Shapiro studied political science at the University of Rochester and earned his Juris Doctor degree from Georgetown University. He was elected to the Pennsylvania House of Representatives in 2004, defeating former Republican U.S. representative Jon D. Fox. He represented the 153rd district from 2005 to 2012.

Shapiro was elected to the Montgomery County Board of Commissioners in 2011, marking the first time Republicans lost control of Montgomery County. Serving on the board from 2011 to 2017, he held the position of chairman and in 2015 was also appointed chairman of the Pennsylvania Commission on Crime and Delinquency by Governor Tom Wolf.

Shapiro ran for Pennsylvania attorney general in 2016, defeating Republican John Rafferty Jr., and was reelected in 2020. As attorney general, he released the findings of a statewide grand jury report that revealed the abuse of children by priests and coverup by church leaders; he also helped negotiate $1 billion for Pennsylvania as part of a national opioid settlement.

In 2021, Shapiro announced his candidacy for governor of Pennsylvania in the 2022 election. He ran unopposed in the Democratic primary and defeated Republican nominee Doug Mastriano in the general election by a 14.8% margin.

Early life and education
Shapiro was born on June 20, 1973, in Kansas City, Missouri, to a father serving in the Navy, and was raised in Dresher, a part of Upper Dublin Township in Montgomery County, Pennsylvania. His father, Steven, is a pediatrician, and his mother is a teacher. At a young age, Shapiro started a worldwide letter-writing program, known as Children for Avi, on behalf of Russian Jewish refuseniks. He attended high school at Akiba Hebrew Academy, now known as Jack M. Barrack Hebrew Academy, and then located in Merion Station, Pennsylvania. Shapiro played basketball in high school and was one of the team's captains during his senior year.

He attended the University of Rochester, where he majored in political science and became the first freshman to win election as the student body president of the University of Rochester in 1992. He graduated magna cum laude in 1995. While working on Capitol Hill, he enrolled at the Georgetown University Law Center as an evening student and earned a Juris Doctor in 2002.

Early career

Capitol Hill 
After graduating from Rochester, Shapiro moved to Washington, D.C. He started as legislative assistant to Senator Carl Levin, then served as a senior adviser to Representative Peter Deutsch, and then a senior advisor to Senator Robert Torricelli. While working for Torricelli, Shapiro planned foreign affairs tours in the Middle East and Asia, including a trip to North Korea.

From 1999 to 2003, he worked as Chief of Staff to Representative Joe Hoeffel, who represented parts of Montgomery County, Pennsylvania.

Pennsylvania House of Representatives 

In 2004, Shapiro ran for the Pennsylvania House of Representatives in the 153rd district. He faced the Republican nominee, former Congressman Jon D. Fox. Shapiro trailed in polling during the beginning of the race, but knocked on 10,000 doors and ran a campaign centered around increasing  education funding and better access to health care. He was elected by a margin of ten points over Fox. He was reelected in 2006, 2008, and 2010.

As a member of the Pennsylvania House of Representatives, he built a reputation as a consensus builder, who was willing to work across the aisle on a bipartisan basis. Following the 2006 elections, Democrats controlled the Pennsylvania State House by one seat, but the party was unable to unite behind a candidate for Speaker of the House. Shapiro helped to broker a deal that resulted in the election of moderate Republican Dennis O'Brien as Speaker of the House. O'Brien subsequently named Shapiro as deputy speaker of the house.

While a state representative, Shapiro was one of the first public backers of then-Senator Barack Obama for president in 2008. This was in contrast with much of the Pennsylvania political establishment, which supported Hillary Clinton in the Democratic primary.

From 2006 through 2017, Shapiro also practiced corporate law at the firm Stradley, Ronon, Stevens, and Young in Philadelphia.

Montgomery County commissioner 

Shapiro won election to the Montgomery County Board of Commissioners in 2011; the election marked the first time in history that the Republican Party lost control of the Montgomery County Board of Commissioners. Shapiro became chairman of the board of commissioners, initially serving alongside Democrat Leslie Richards and Republican Bruce Castor.

Shapiro's commission duties centered around social services and administration. Castor, the only Republican member of the board during Shapiro's tenure, praised Shapiro's work, calling him "the best county commissioner I ever knew" and "very good at arriving at consensus." In 2016, Shapiro voted for an 11% tax increase, which was an average increase of $66 in property taxes. During his tenure, the board of commissioners implemented zero-based budgeting and shifted county pension investments from hedge funds to index funds. Democrats retained a majority on the board of commissioners in the 2015 election, as Shapiro and his running mate, Val Arkoosh, both won election.

Shapiro chaired the board from 2012 to 2016.

In April 2015, Governor Tom Wolf named Shapiro the Chair of the Pennsylvania Commission on Crime and Delinquency.

Pennsylvania Attorney General

Shapiro announced his candidacy for Pennsylvania Attorney General in January 2016. While he had practiced with Philadelphia's Stradley Ronon firm and chaired the Pennsylvania Commission on Crime and Delinquency, he had never served as a prosecutor. Shapiro campaigned on his promise to restore the office's integrity following Kathleen Kane's resignation and also promised to work to combat the opioid epidemic and gun violence. His campaign was supported by President Barack Obama, presidential candidate Hillary Clinton, and businessman and former Mayor of New York City Michael Bloomberg, who was among the largest donors to Shapiro's campaign. He won the Democratic primary for attorney general in April 2016, defeating Stephen Zappala and John Morganelli with 47% of the vote. In November 2016, Shapiro narrowly defeated the Republican nominee, State Senator John Rafferty Jr., with 51.3% of the vote.

Shapiro was reelected in 2020, defeating Republican nominee Heather Heidelbaugh with 50.9% of the vote. He received 3,461,472 votes, the most of any candidate in Pennsylvania history, and outran Joe Biden in the concurrent presidential election.

Tenure
In 2017, Shapiro announced the roundup of a "Million Dollar Heroin Ring" under "Operation Outfoxed" in Luzerne County. All the charges in Operation Outfoxed were dismissed after allegations that Shapiro had mishandled the sealing of wiretapped recordings.

Shapiro joined several other state attorneys general in opposing President Donald Trump's travel ban, and also sued Trump and the Roman Catholic organization Little Sisters of the Poor to block the implementation of a rule that would have made it easier for employers to deny health insurance coverage of contraceptives. He also joined a lawsuit against ITT Technical Institute, a for-profit educational institute, that resulted in a $168 million settlement (with about $5 million of that settlement going to Pennsylvania students). In 2018, he reached an agreement with federal officials to prevent the distribution of blueprints for 3D printed firearms. In 2019, he came out in support of the legalization of marijuana for recreational use by adults, joining Governor Tom Wolf and other leading Pennsylvania Democrats.

Before Shapiro took office in 2016, the Pennsylvania Attorney's General office launched an investigation of allegations of sexual abuse perpetrated by members of the Catholic Church. Shapiro chose to move forward with the investigation, and, in August 2018, released the results of an extensive grand jury report. The report alleged the sexual abuse of more than 1,000 children at the hands of over 300 priests. It prompted similar investigations in other states into the Catholic Church, such as an inquiry launched by then-Missouri Attorney General Josh Hawley.

In January 2018, Centre County District Attorney Bernard Cantorna referred the case of the death of Tim Piazza, a Penn State student who was hazed, to Shapiro, because Cantorna had previously served as a criminal defense attorney for one of the defendants. Multiple defendants pleaded guilty.

In August 2018, Philadelphia District Attorney Larry Krasner referred the case of the fatal shooting of Jeffrey Dennis by a Philadelphia police officer to Shapiro, because Krasner had previously served as Dennis's criminal defense attorney. Dennis was in his car when he was "box[ed] in" by undercover officers in unmarked vehicles; three officers were injured after Dennis tried to evade them. In December, Shapiro announced no charges would be filed against the officers, saying, "violations of police procedure do not always rise to the level of criminal charges". Dennis's family subsequently sued the officer and city of Philadelphia for the incident.

In 2019, Shapiro led efforts to ensure that insurance holders of Highmark, a healthcare company, can receive treatment at the University of Pittsburgh Medical Center. The settlement allowed 1.9 million insurance recipients to continue using their existing doctors as in-plan providers rather than being forced to switch either medical providers or insurance providers.

Shapiro was one of 20 electors selected by the Pennsylvania Democratic Party to vote in the Electoral College for Joe Biden and his running mate Kamala Harris in 2020 United States presidential election.

Shapiro announced an opioid settlement in 2021 with Johnson & Johnson and three other U.S. pharmaceutical distributors that resulted in Pennsylvania receiving $1 billion. The settlement resolved thousands of lawsuits against the companies for their role in fueling the opioid epidemic.

As attorney general, Shapiro has charged members of his own party with corruption. In December 2019, he charged State Representative Movita Johnson-Harrell with perjury and theft of funds from her supposedly nonprofit charity on such things as vacations and clothing. In July 2021, Shapiro charged State Representative Margo L. Davidson with theft by deception, solicitation to hinder apprehension, and Election Code violations after stealing from the Commonwealth by filing fraudulent overnight per diem requests and various other expenses through the Pennsylvania House of Representatives Comptroller's Office as well as hindering a state prosecution.

In August 2021, Shapiro settled the largest prevailing wage criminal case in U.S. history. Under the plea, Glenn O. Hawbaker Inc., paid nearly $21 million to 1,267 Pennsylvania workers.

Governor of Pennsylvania

2022 election 

Shapiro had long been expected to run for governor of Pennsylvania, and on October 13, 2021, he announced his candidacy in the 2022 election. In January 2022, Shapiro's campaign reported it had $13.4 million in campaign funds, which was described as a record amount for a candidate in an election year. Shapiro faced no opponents in the Democratic primary, and secured the nomination on May 17, 2022. He faced Republican nominee Doug Mastriano in the general election.

Shapiro ran on a platform of protecting voting rights, abortion rights, and raising the minimum wage to $15 an hour. His campaign was criticized by some progressives because of his support for capital punishment for "heinous crimes", his public feuds with Philadelphia District Attorney Larry Krasner, and his compromising with police unions to pass police reform bills. But efforts to enlist a progressive primary challenge to Shapiro were unsuccessful. Shapiro later changed his position, now saying he opposes capital punishment and would sign a bill to abolish it.

During the leadup to the primary election, Shapiro's campaign released a statewide televised advertisement calling a Mastriano win "a win for what Donald Trump stands for", referencing Mastriano's stance on outlawing abortion and his efforts to audit the 2020 presidential election. The ad was seen as an "endorsement" of the Republican candidate Shapiro would want to face in the general election, with Mastriano seen as too extreme for swing voters to elect. Mastriano won the Republican primary and his closest opponent, former Congressman Lou Barletta, later said that Shapiro's ads likely helped. The impact of Shapiro's ads on the primary is disputed as Mastriano was already in the lead.

Platform 
Shapiro has said that as governor he will protect abortion access in Pennsylvania and veto any bill passed the state legislature passes that outlaws abortion. In contrast, Mastriano said he would support outlawing abortion in Pennsylvania without any exceptions, including in cases of rape or the mother's life being at risk. 

Before running for governor, Shapiro had supported capital punishment for what he called "heinous crimes". During his campaign, he announced that he now favored abolishing the death penalty in Pennsylvania, a reversal of his previous position. Shapiro was asked in a 2022 interview with Pennsylvania Capital-Star why his position changed, to which he responded: 
[The] question is a fair one ... When I ran for [attorney general] in 2016, I said that the death penalty should be reserved for the most heinous of crimes. But then I got elected attorney general and I saw these cases come across my desk. I got closer to a system that I thought was in need of reform. And as attorney general I never once sought the death penalty. As governor, I'd be in a policymaking role, together with the Legislature … and I thought it was important when asked to state my position unequivocally that I would sign legislation to abolish the death penalty. Shapiro also said he would not sign any future death warrants for prisoners on death row.

Shapiro supports cutting Pennsylvania's nearly 10% corporate tax rate to 4% by 2025. He has proposed hiring 2,000 additional police officers across Pennsylvania, saying, the "more police officers we hire, the more opportunities we have for them to get out of their patrol cars, walk the beat, learn the names of the kids in the communities". Shapiro favors pardoning those convicted for possession of small amount of marijuana.

On efforts to mitigate COVID-19, Shapiro has broken with some in the Democratic Party and opposes mask and vaccine mandates. He prefers educating the public about vaccines' efficacy. Shapiro is also skeptical about Pennsylvania joining the Regional Greenhouse Gas Initiative, a market-based program to reduce some greenhouse gas emissions. He has proposed expanding Pennsylvania's clean energy portfolio for utility companies, greater electric car infrastructure and investing in clean energy research and development. Shapiro supports a Lifeline Scholarship bill, which creates education savings accounts for children in failing public schools that can be spent on approved expenses including tutoring, instructional materials and private school tuition.

Shapiro has proposed a plan that will allow for a $250 gas tax refund per personal passenger vehicle up to four vehicles per household. He proposed funding the proposal with funds from the American Rescue Plan. On the issue of vocational training, Shapiro has proposed increasing career and technical training in high schools, tripling state funding for apprenticeships and union skills programs, and creating a Pennsylvania office of workforce development. He also supports eliminating four-year degree requirements for state government jobs. Shapiro is a supporter of unions and has vowed to veto any "right to work" legislation.

Endorsements and support 

Before his announcement, term-limited Governor Tom Wolf endorsed Shapiro. He also received endorsements from former Governor Ed Rendell, State Senator Anthony H. Williams, former Pennsylvania Democratic Party chair Marcel Groen, and the Planned Parenthood Action Fund. Additionally, he was endorsed by the SEIU Pennsylvania State Council, four SEIU local unions consisting of over 80,000 SEIU members in the state. In January 2022 the Pennsylvania Democratic Committee unanimously endorsed him. The committee also endorsed his preferred running mate, State Representative Austin Davis. Other union support included the Philadelphia Carpenters Union and Sheet Metal workers, the Western Pennsylvania Laborers' PAC, and the Electricians Union Local No. 5 in Pittsburgh.

Eight former Republican officials, including former Pennsylvania Supreme Court Justice Sandra Schultz Newman and former Congressman Charlie Dent, as well as the sitting Republican chairman of the Lawrence County Board of Commissioners, Morgan Boyd, endorsed Shapiro, with several calling Mastriano "extreme" and "divisive". Seven more former Republican officials, including former U.S. Secretary of Homeland Security Michael Chertoff, endorsed Shapiro in August 2022 for the same reason.

Results 
On November 8, 2022, Shapiro defeated Mastriano with 56.2% of the vote to Mastriano's 42.0%. Shapiro carried 17 counties.

Tenure 
 
Shapiro is the third Jewish governor in the history of Pennsylvania, after Milton Shapp (1971–1979) and Ed Rendell (2003–2011). He was sworn in on January 17, 2023, succeeding former governor Tom Wolf.

Personal life 
Shapiro met his wife Lori in ninth grade as they both attended Akiba Hebrew Academy, now Jack M. Barrack Hebrew Academy, then in Merion Station. They dated in high school and reconnected after college while both were living in Washington D.C. Shapiro proposed to her in Jerusalem in 1997. He married her on May 25 of that year.

Shapiro and his wife have four children and reside in the Governor's Residence in Harrisburg, Pennsylvania. Shapiro is an observant Conservative Jew who keeps kosher.<ref name="Forward" /

Electoral history

References

External links

Governor Josh Shapiro official government website
Josh Shapiro for Governor campaign website

|-

|-

 
|-

|-

|-

|-

|-
{{s-aft|after=Otherwise 
|-

 

 

1973 births
2012 United States presidential electors
2020 United States presidential electors
20th-century American Jews
21st-century American Jews
21st-century American politicians
American Jews from Pennsylvania
American Conservative Jews
Democratic Party governors of Pennsylvania
Democratic Party members of the Pennsylvania House of Representatives
Georgetown University Law Center alumni
Jack M. Barrack Hebrew Academy alumni
Jewish American people in Pennsylvania politics
Jewish American state governors of the United States
Jewish American state legislators in Pennsylvania
Lawyers from Kansas City, Missouri
Living people
Montgomery County Commissioners (Pennsylvania)
Pennsylvania Attorneys General
People from Upper Dublin Township, Pennsylvania
Politicians from Kansas City, Missouri
University of Rochester alumni